In mathematics, logic and computer science, a formal language is called recursively enumerable (also recognizable, partially decidable, semidecidable, Turing-acceptable or Turing-recognizable) if it is a recursively enumerable subset in the set of all possible words over the alphabet of the language, i.e., if there exists a Turing machine which will enumerate all valid strings of the language.

Recursively enumerable languages are known as type-0 languages in the Chomsky hierarchy of formal languages. All regular, context-free, context-sensitive and recursive languages are recursively enumerable.

The class of all recursively enumerable languages is called RE.

Definitions
There are three equivalent definitions of a recursively enumerable language:

 A recursively enumerable language is a recursively enumerable subset in the set of all possible words over the alphabet of the language.
 A recursively enumerable language is a formal language for which there exists a Turing machine (or other computable function) which will enumerate all valid strings of the language. Note that if the language is infinite, the enumerating algorithm provided can be chosen so that it avoids repetitions, since we can test whether the string produced for number n is "already" produced for a number which is less than n. If it already is produced, use the output for input n+1 instead (recursively), but again, test whether it is "new".
 A recursively enumerable language is a formal language for which there exists a Turing machine (or other computable function) that will halt and accept when presented with any string in the language as input but may either halt and reject or loop forever when presented with a string not in the language. Contrast this to recursive languages, which require that the Turing machine halts in all cases.

All regular, context-free, context-sensitive and recursive languages are recursively enumerable.

Post's theorem shows that RE, together with its complement co-RE, correspond to the first level of the arithmetical hierarchy.

Example
The set of halting turing machines is recursively enumerable but not recursive. Indeed, one can run the Turing Machine and accept if the machine halts, hence it is recursively enumerable. On the other hand, the problem is undecidable.

Some other recursively enumerable languages that are not recursive include:

 Post correspondence problem 
 Mortality (computability theory)
 Entscheidungsproblem

Closure properties
Recursively enumerable languages (REL) are closed under the following operations. That is, if L and P are two recursively enumerable languages, then the following languages are recursively enumerable as well:

 the Kleene star  of L
 the concatenation  of L and P
 the union 
 the intersection .

Recursively enumerable languages are not closed under set difference or complementation. The set difference  −  is recursively enumerable if  is recursive.

See also 
Computably enumerable set
Recursion

References
 Sipser, M. (1996), Introduction to the Theory of Computation, PWS Publishing Co.
 Kozen, D.C. (1997), Automata and Computability, Springer.

External links
 
 Lecture slides

Formal languages
Theory of computation
Mathematics of computing
Alan Turing